Sunny is a young adult novel by Jason Reynolds, published April 10, 2018, by Atheneum. It is the third book in Reynold's Track series, preceded by Ghost (2016), Patina (2017), and followed by Lu (2018).

Reception 
Sunny received starred reviews from Kirkus Reviews and Booklist. Booklist wrote, "Reynolds is on a run almost unparalleled in YA, and this standout series will continue to be in demand." They further indicated that "this series continues to provide beautiful opportunities for discussion about viewpoint, privilege, loss, diversity of experience, and exactly how much we don’t know about those around us." Kirkus called the it "another literary pacesetter that will leave Reynolds’ readers wanting more."

The Horn Book also provided a positive review.

Sunny is a Junior Library Guild book.

References 

Atheneum Books books
2018 children's books
Books by Jason Reynolds